Dobromir is a commune in Constanța County, Northern Dobruja, Romania. It includes six villages:
 Dobromir (historical names: Dobromir-Vale, Dobromiru din Vale until 1968)
 Cetatea (historical names: Asârlâc)
 Dobromiru din Deal
 Lespezi (historical names: Techechioi)
 Pădureni (historical name: Nastradin until 1968)
 Văleni (historical names: Enisenlia, Enişelia, Eniselia, Valea Rea until 1964)

Since December 2018 Dobromir has been linked with the neighbouring commune of Krushari in Bulgaria via the Krushari–Dobromir border crossing.

Demographics
At the 2002 census, 50.3% of inhabitants were Turks and 49.7% Romanians. 50.3% were Muslim and 49.6% Romanian Orthodox.
At the 2011 census, Dobromir had 1,084 Romanians (38.00%), 1,767 Turks (61.93%), 2 others (0.07%). It is the only Romanian commune with a Turkish and Muslim majority.

References

Communes in Constanța County
Localities in Northern Dobruja
Place names of Slavic origin in Romania
Turkish communities in Romania
Bulgaria–Romania border crossings